Traditional marriage may refer to:

Marriage and its customs and practices in a particular culture
Christian views on marriage
Islamic views on marriage
Opposite-sex marriage, used primarily by opponents of same-sex marriage.  
Traditional marriage customs in the Philippines